Ryan Bidounga (born 29 April 1997) is a professional footballer who plays as a defender for Bulgarian First League club CSKA 1948. Born in France, he represents Congo at international level.

Club career
Bidounga made his professional debut with Nancy in a 1–0 Coupe de la Ligue win over Caen on 13 August 2019.

On 17 February 2022, Bidounga signed with Bulgarian First League club Lokomotiv Plovdiv.

International career
Born in France, Bidounga is of Congolese descent. He is a youth international for France. He was called up to represent the Congo national team for a set of friendlies in March 2022. He debuted with the Congo in a friendly 3–1 loss to Zambia on 25 March 2022.

References

External links
 
 
 
 
 

1997 births
Living people
People from Rambouillet
Republic of the Congo footballers
Republic of the Congo international footballers
French footballers
France youth international footballers
French sportspeople of Republic of the Congo descent
Association football defenders
AS Nancy Lorraine players
Le Mans FC players
PFC Lokomotiv Plovdiv players
Ligue 2 players
Championnat National players
Championnat National 3 players
First Professional Football League (Bulgaria) players
Expatriate footballers in Bulgaria
Republic of the Congo expatriate footballers
Republic of the Congo expatriates in Bulgaria
French expatriate footballers
French expatriates in Bulgaria
Black French sportspeople